David or Dave Stevens may refer to:

 David Stevens, Baron Stevens of Ludgate (born 1936), Conservative Independent peer in the House of Lords
 David Stevens (businessman) (born 1962), British businessman, CEO of Admiral Group
 David Stephens, vocalist for the band We Came as Romans
 Dave Stevens (1955–2008), illustrator
 Dave Stevens (baseball) (born 1970), American baseball player
 Dave Stevens (amputee sportsman) (born 1966), athlete and sports broadcaster
 David Stevens (screenwriter) (1940–2018), Australian Academy-award nominated screenwriter for Breaker Morant
 David Stevens (politician), American politician, Member of the Arizona House of Representatives

See also
 David Stephens (disambiguation)